Vedat Önsoy (born 7 July 1959) is a Turkish boxer. He competed in the men's welterweight event at the 1984 Summer Olympics.

References

1959 births
Living people
Turkish male boxers
Olympic boxers of Turkey
Boxers at the 1984 Summer Olympics
Place of birth missing (living people)
Welterweight boxers
20th-century Turkish people